Institute of Geography may refer to:

 Institute of Geographical Information Systems
 Institute of Geography (Pedagogical University of Kraków)
 Brazilian Institute of Geography and Statistics
 National Institute of Statistics and Geography (Mexico)
 Pan American Institute of Geography and History
 Geographic Institute Agustín Codazzi
 V.B. Sochava Institute of Geography SB RAS
 Institute of Geography of the National Academy of Sciences of Ukraine, a research institute of the National Academy of Sciences of Ukraine